Kevin Short is an American operatic bass-baritone. A graduate of Morgan State University, the Curtis Institute of Music, and the Juilliard School, he won the bass-baritone award for the Middle Atlantic region Metropolitan Opera National Council Auditions in 1989. From 1991 to 1998 he appeared annually at the Metropolitan Opera, singing in a total of 129 performances. He notably created the role of Joseph in the world premiere of John Corigliano's The Ghosts of Versailles in 1991. Some of the other roles he has performed at the Met are Colline in La Bohème, the Friar in Don Carlos, Happy in La fanciulla del West, the Jailer in Dialogues of the Carmelites, Lackey in Ariadne auf Naxos, Mandarin in Turandot, Masetto in Don Giovanni, Sciarrone in Tosca, Pirro in I Lombardi alla prima crociata, Yamadori in Madama Butterfly, and Zaretsky in Eugene Onegin. He also sang several roles with the New York City Opera during the 1980s and 1990s, including Nourabad in The Pearl Fishers and Raimondo in Lucia di Lammermoor.

Since the late 1990s, Short has worked actively with opera houses internationally. From 2001 to 2004 he was a member of Theatre Basel, singing such roles as Landgrave in Tannhäuser, Mephistopheles in Faust, Oroveso in Norma, Sarastro in The Magic Flute, Seneca in L'Incoronazione di Poppea, and Simone in Gianni Schicchi. In 2003 he made his debut at the Vienna Volksoper as Leporello in Don Giovanni. He appeared in the original production of William Bolcom's A Wedding at the Lyric Opera of Chicago in January 2005. He has also appeared as a guest artist with the Bern Theatre, the Canadian Opera Company, the Houston Grand Opera, the Indianapolis Opera, the Los Angeles Opera, the Michigan Opera Theatre, the Opera Company of Philadelphia, Opera Omaha, Opera Pacific, the Opera Theatre of Saint Louis, the Santa Fe Opera, the Sarasota Opera, the Seattle Opera, the Vancouver Opera, the Washington National Opera, and the Zurich Opera among others.

References

Living people
American opera singers
Curtis Institute of Music alumni
Juilliard School alumni
Operatic bass-baritones
Morgan State University alumni
Year of birth missing (living people)